The 2017 Paf Masters Tour was held October 12 to 15, 2017 at the Vianor Curling Center in Eckerö, Åland, Finland as a part of the 2017–18 curling season. The event was held in a round robin format with eight teams advancing to the playoffs. The purse for the event was € 18,600.

In the final, Team Kim Eun-jung of South Korea capped off a perfect 6–0 tournament by defeating the previously undefeated Shannon Kleibrink rink from Canada 7–5 in the final. In the third place game, Therese Westman of Sweden topped Ayumi Ogasawara of Japan 6–3. To reach the final, Kim defeated Ogasawara 5–4 in one semifinal and Kleibrink beat Westman 5–3 in the other.

Teams
The teams are listed as follows:

Round-robin standings
Final round-robin standings

Round-robin results
All draw times are listed in Eastern European Time (UTC+02:00).

Draw 1
Thursday, October 12, 1:00 pm

Draw 2
Thursday, October 12, 4:30 pm

Draw 3
Thursday, October 12, 8:00 pm

Draw 4
Friday, October 13, 8:00 am

Draw 5
Friday, October 13, 11:00 am

Draw 6
Friday, October 13, 2:00 pm

Draw 7
Friday, October 13, 5:00 pm

Draw 8
Friday, October 13, 8:00 pm

Draw 9
Saturday, October 14, 8:00 am

Playoffs

Source:

Quarterfinals
Saturday, October 14, 12:00 pm

Saturday, October 14, 3:00 pm

Semifinals
Sunday, October 15, 10:00 am

Third place game
Sunday, October 15, 2:00 pm

Final
Sunday, October 15, 2:00 pm

References

External links

2017 in women's curling
International sports competitions hosted by Finland
Women's curling competitions in Finland
Paf Masters Touur
Sport in Åland